Ron Morton Thomas (November 19, 1950 – July 14, 2018) was an American basketball player. He played at both the college and professional level in the United States.

Thomas, a native of Louisville, Kentucky, graduated from Thomas Jefferson High School in Louisville, played college basketball at the University of Louisville.

Thomas was drafted by the Seattle SuperSonics of the National Basketball Association (NBA) in the 6th round of the 1972 NBA draft.  He instead signed with the Kentucky Colonels of the American Basketball Association.

Thomas played for four seasons with the Colonels, scoring over 1,000 points in his professional career.  He was part of the Colonels team that won the 1975 ABA Championship.

Thomas died on July 14, 2018.

He was drafted to the Houston Rockets in the 1976 ABA dispersal draft, but never played a single NBA game.

References

External links
BasketballReference.com page

1950 births
2018 deaths
20th-century African-American sportspeople
21st-century African-American people
African-American basketball players
American men's basketball players
Basketball players from Louisville, Kentucky
Forwards (basketball)
Kentucky Colonels players
Louisville Cardinals men's basketball players
Seattle SuperSonics draft picks
Trinity Valley Cardinals men's basketball players